The 1993 Croatian local elections were held on 7 February. This was first local elections in Croatia after declaration of independence and breakaway from Yugoslavia. Also this was first election under new law which abolished the Council of Local Communities, the Socio-Political Council and the Council of Associated Labor at the level of towns and municipalities, and introduced counties into use.

On February 8, 2013, the 20th anniversary of the first local elections was held in the organization of the Umbrella Association of Local Self-Government (Kolos), under the auspices of Croatian President Ivo Josipović. Josipović assessed that the first local elections in wartime showed that democratic development could not be stopped.

Electoral system 
Regional and local self-government elections are conducted in such a way that half of the members of county, city and municipal councils are elected through a joint list covering the entire local self-government unit, and the condition for the distribution of seats is an electoral threshold of 5%. The other half through individual constituencies. If two or more candidates receive the same number of votes, the election shall be repeated in that constituency. According to the law, in the first elections, municipal councils elect 16 councilors, city councils 26 councilors, county assemblies 40 councilors and the City Assembly of Zagreb 60 members. City and municipality mayors as well as county prefects are elected by the city, municipality and county council.

Election results

Counties

Cities

1 Result available for 14 out of 26 seats.

Elections in Capital 
1993 Zagreb local elections

References

1993 in Croatia
1993
1993 elections in Croatia
February 1993 events in Europe